The Program in Placebo Studies and the Therapeutic Encounter  was founded in July 2011, at Beth Israel Deaconess Medical Center and the Harvard Medical School.  Its purpose is to bring together researchers who are examining the placebo response. 

PiPS is led by the following members of the Harvard faculty: 
 Ted Kaptchuk, Director
 Irving Kirsch, PhD, Associate Director
 Randy L. Gollub, MD, PhD, Director of Neuroimaging
 Anne Harrington, PhD, Director of Initiatives in the Humanities
 Efi Kokkoutou, MD, PhD, Director of Molecular Biology Research
 John Kelley, PhD, Director of Psychological Research
 Anthony Lembo, MD, Director of Clinical Research

External links 
Program in Placebo Studies and the Therapeutic Encounter website

Research projects